Maciej Rosołek (born 2 September 2001) is a Polish professional footballer who plays for Ekstraklasa club Legia Warsaw.

He started his career in the juniors of Pogoń Siedlce. Then he moved to Legia Warsaw. In 2021–22, he was on loan at Arka Gdynia, which ended on 3 January 2022. In his first match after returning to Legia, on 4 February, he scored the opening goal in a 3–1 victory at Zagłębie Lubin.

Honours
Legia Warsaw
Ekstraklasa: 2019–20, 2020–21

References

External links
 
 

Polish footballers
2001 births
Living people
Association football forwards
Poland youth international footballers
Poland under-21 international footballers
Legia Warsaw II players
Legia Warsaw players
Arka Gdynia players
Ekstraklasa players
I liga players
III liga players